The Cape May National Wildlife Refuge is a protected area on the Cape May Peninsula in Cape May County, New Jersey. It is part of the National Wildlife Refuge System and managed by the United States Fish and Wildlife Service. It comprises three distinct and non-contiguous units: the Delaware Bay Division (in Middle Township), the Great Cedar Swamp Division (in Dennis Township and Upper Township) and the Two Mile Beach Unit (in Lower Township). Located in the Middle Atlantic coastal forests ecoregion, the cape provides habitat for large numbers of migratory birds.

Wildlife
Cape May National Wildlife Refuge provides critical habitat to a wide variety of migratory birds and other wildlife. It supports 317 bird species, 42 mammal species, 55 reptile and amphibian species, and numerous fish, shellfish and other invertebrates. Its value for the protection of migratory birds and their habitat will continue to grow as wildlife habitat along the Jersey Shore is developed into roads, shopping centers and housing developments. Cape May Peninsula's unique configuration and location concentrate songbirds, raptors and woodcock as they funnel south to Cape May Point during their fall migration.

Shorebirds
The refuge's five-mile stretch along the Delaware Bay is a major resting and feeding area for migrating shorebirds and wading birds each spring. The Delaware Bay shoreline has gained international recognition as a major shorebird staging area in North America second only to the Copper River Delta in Alaska. Each year hundreds of thousands of shorebirds-nearly 80 percent of some populations-stop to rest and feed here during their spring migration from Central and South America to their Arctic breeding grounds. The arrival at Cape May of more than twenty shorebird species-primarily red knots, ruddy turnstones, sanderlings and semipalmated sandpipers-coincides with the horseshoe crab spawning season which occurs in May/early June. The crab eggs provide an abundant food supply which these long-distance flyers use to replenish their energy reserves before moving on. (In May large numbers of red knots gather along Delaware Bay beaches.)

In 1992, because of its value to migrating shorebirds and wading birds, it was designated a Wetland of International Importance as part of the Delaware Bay Estuary.

Songbirds / Neotropical migrants
Neotropical migrants—birds that spend their summers in Canada and the U.S. and their winters in Mexico, the Caribbean, Central America and South America—use Cape May Peninsula's varied habitats in great abundance during their long and difficult migrations. Due to loss of habitat throughout much of their range many of these species are in decline. Almost 100 neotropical songbird species stop to rest and feed along the Cape May Peninsula most often using forest habitats. Many songbird species also nest here including ovenbirds, wood thrushes and yellow-throated warblers.

Raptors
Cape May Peninsula is renowned for its spectacular raptor migrations each fall. During this period great numbers of 17 raptor species are commonly seen including peregrine falcons, ospreys, northern harriers, American kestrels, Cooper's and sharp-shinned hawks. Because many raptors do not choose to cross such large bodies of water as the Delaware Bay, many use the bayshore upland forest edge as a migration corridor.

All raptor species found in southern New Jersey occur on the refuge. Some, like the red-tailed hawk, frequent the refuge all year. After a population decline in the 1970s, bald eagles once again nest on refuge land. Owl populations make extensive use of Cape May's woodland habitats in winter, and several species—such as the barred owl—also nest here.

American woodcock

During fall migration these unique upland shorebirds concentrate in massive numbers in Cape May's moist woodlands and thickets. They use such habitats for foraging, replenishing their fat reserves by eating more than their weight in earthworms daily. On the East Coast of the United States, only Cape Charles, Virginia hosts comparable concentrations of woodcock. The refuge provides excellent resting and feeding habitat for this interesting species.

Endangered and threatened species
The threatened piping plover uses Two Mile Beach Unit for feeding and roosting. New Jersey State-listed species confirmed within the refuge boundary include ospreys, short-eared owls, barred owls, red-shouldered hawks, grasshopper sparrows, great and little blue herons, red-headed woodpeckers, sedge wrens, yellow-crowned night-herons, northern harriers, black rails, southern gray tree frogs, eastern tiger and mud salamanders, corn snakes and northern pine snakes.

Swamp pink—a unique lily family member which is on the Federal List of Endangered and Threatened Plants and Animals—also occurs on the refuge, as do 34 state-listed plant species.

Fishery resources
Cape May National Wildlife Refuge's marshes and tidal creeks provide important nursery areas and nutrient resources for many popular species of finfish and shellfish including summer flounder, weakfish, striped bass, blue crabs and lady crabs. These fisheries provide abundant resources for wildlife as well as for people. Seventy percent of the species sought by recreational and commercial fishermen depend on shallow water habitats such as those found on the refuge for at least part of their life cycle.

See also
Supawna Meadows National Wildlife Refuge
Edwin B. Forsythe National Wildlife Refuge
Killcohook National Wildlife Refuge
The Glades (New Jersey)

References

External links

 U.S. Fish and Wildlife Service page about Cape May NWR

Protected areas of Cape May County, New Jersey
National Wildlife Refuges in New Jersey
Ramsar sites in the United States
Protected areas established in 1989
Wetlands of New Jersey
Landforms of Cape May County, New Jersey